Richard Dawkins is an English ethologist, evolutionary biologist, and writer. Dawkins himself has stated that his political views are left-leaning. However, many of Dawkins's political statements have created controversy among left-wing and atheist communities.

Political affiliation

Labour Party 

Before the mid-2000s, Dawkins usually voted for Labour Party candidates. The party has often been described as social democratic.

In 2009 Dawkins participated in a New Statesman project called "20 ways to save Labour", in which 20 public figures, including Dawkins as well as Germaine Greer and John Pilger, among others gave suggestions about how to make the Labour Party better. Dawkins's contribution was as follows:

Liberal Democrats 

Starting in the mid-2000s, Dawkins has also voted and expressed support for the Liberal Democrats. Dawkins spoke at the party's conference in 2009 and publicly expressed his support then. At the conference, Dawkins strongly criticised the English libel laws, and the party revised its policy on the issue at the same conference. Dawkins also called for an alliance of all Liberal Democrats based on an agreement on electoral reform.

Social views

Free expression
Dawkins has argued for reform to the English defamation law, arguing that Simon Singh should have the right to criticise scientific claims made by the British Chiropractic Association. In 2009, he said "I and many of my colleagues fear that if Simon loses it will have major implications on the freedom of scientists, researchers and other commentators to engage in robust criticism of scientific and pseudo-scientific work." The Defamation Act 2013 substantially reformed the law.

In 2008, Dawkins pointed out major factual errors in The Atlas of Creation, such as images of fishing lures mislabeled as insects, and subsequently his website has been banned in Turkey and Pakistan. Dawkins gave a speech at the 2012 Jaipur Literature Festival where a video link with Salman Rushdie was cancelled due to ongoing controversy over the Rushdie affair. He has given a high appraisal of Nick Cohen's book You Can't Read this Book, arguing that libel laws create a culture of "tacit censorship" in liberal democracies.

In 2009, Dawkins agreed to give a talk at the University of Oklahoma, and the Oklahoma House of Representatives introduced bills attacking him, declaring that his views on evolution are "contrary and offensive to the views and opinions of most citizens of Oklahoma." In his speech, the professor argued that "what's really offensive is the bizarre idea that a state university should only ever hear opinions that its citizens agree with. If that principle is ever accepted you can kiss goodbye anything that a university stands for. What on earth is a university for if it only reinforces opinions that students and the public already hold?" Dawkins has argued against campaigns by far-left groups on university campuses to have speeches by internationally renowned figures cancelled. In a 2015 interview, Dawkins said "If you only ever get exposed to ideas you agree with, what kind of university would that be?" He has argued against campaigns to block speakers like Ayaan Hirsi Ali, Bill Maher, Maryam Namazie and Germaine Greer.

Dawkins expressed solidarity with Stephen Fry after Irish police investigated Fry over blasphemy allegations.  Dawkins quoted his book, The God Delusion in The Irish Times: "The God of the Old Testament is arguably the most unpleasant character in all fiction: jealous and proud of it; a petty, unjust, unforgiving control-freak; a vindictive, bloodthirsty ethnic cleanser; a misogynistic, homophobic, racist, infanticidal, genocidal, filicidal, pestilential, megalomaniacal, sadomasochistic, capriciously malevolent bully." Dawkins added that he would be in Ireland on 12 June 2017 and challenged the Irish police to arrest him.  Dawkins added in Twitter: "The Irish blasphemy law must go. An embarrassment to the civilised world, it encourages the uncivilised one."

Feminism and women's rights 
Dawkins has said that feminism is "enormously important" and "a political movement that deserves to be supported". Dawkins also released a joint statement with Ophelia Benson that condemned "death threats, rape threats, attacks on people's appearance, age, race, sex, size, haircut...[and] vulgar epithets." In a passage in The God Delusion, Dawkins wrote about how he wished to mirror the successes of feminism in the atheist movement.

However, Dawkins has come under fire from feminists and feminist organizations for many reasons. Several of Dawkins's posts on Twitter were controversial, such as one where he seemed to victim blame the victims of rape when they are drunk. "If you want to be in a position to testify & jail a man, don't get drunk," he tweeted. Amanda Marcotte, in Salon, criticized Dawkins by saying that "For someone who is a supposed rationalist, Dawkins refused to even acknowledge the basic difference between making the choice to break the law and being the victim of a crime." Dawkins was also the subject of controversy when he tweeted, "Date rape is bad. Stranger rape at knifepoint is worse. If you think that's an endorsement of date rape, go away and learn how to think." Marcotte heavily criticized him by saying that "He made a pretty serious logical error...He assumed that the amount of pain that a victim of injustice suffers is directly proportional to the contemporary social norms surrounding it, i.e. if a form of abuse was considered no big deal to most people in a society, the people directly victimized would also feel that way."

In January 2016, Dawkins tweeted a link to a cartoon caricature of feminists and Islamists. Dawkins later deleted the tweet when he realized it mocked real people. Organizers of the 2016 Northeast Conference on Science and Skepticism unilaterally declared his tweet "very offensive" and disinvited him without speaking to him. They later spoke to Dawkins on the phone, and apologised for disinviting him, and re-invited him.

Elevatorgate 

Dawkins was denounced for his comments about a video blog post by atheist blogger and writer Rebecca Watson. The scandal resulting from his comments was called "Elevatorgate". The controversy started at an atheist convention in Dublin, where Rebecca Watson spoke about feminism and the atheist movement. That night, when Watson was in an elevator, she was propositioned by a man, who said "Don't take this the wrong way, but I find you very interesting, and I would like to talk more. Would you like to come to my hotel room for coffee?" Watson found this extremely inappropriate, and afterwards, she made a video blog saying "guys, don't do that." The comments exploded with divisive opinions, and PZ Myers reacted on his blog Pharyngula. On that post, Dawkins unexpectedly made the following comment in the form of a fictitious letter to a Muslim woman complaining of misogyny:

Dawkins was criticized by atheists and others for his remarks. David Allen Green in New Statesman wrote that "One of the many problems here is that Rebecca didn't use her video to downplay the plight of Muslim women from the perspective of an American woman...Just because there is severe misogyny in one context doesn't remove the need to deal rationally and helpfully with its lesser manifestation in other contexts." PZ Myers responded by writing, "This isn't slightly bad. It's very bad. Atheist men are alienating the people we want to work with us on the very same problems...that you cited in your comment."

Dawkins tried to clarify his argument, but this elicited several more negative responses:

Watson herself issued the following boycott of Dawkins as a response to his posts:

As part of a reaction to the controversy, Skepchick writers wrote open letters to Dawkins explaining why they believed his comments were offensive and misguided.

LGBT issues 
Dawkins strongly argues for a genetic basis for homosexuality and postulates that the gene was preserved through various social and cultural processes. Dawkins has also stated that homosexuality does not conflict with the evolutionary principle. In a talk at Kennesaw State University, he said that "[Evolution] is the explanation for why we exist. It is not something to guide our lives in our own society. [...] What we need is a truly anti-Darwinian society—anti-Darwinian in the sense that we do not wish to live in a society where...the strongest suppress the weak...I want to live in a society where we take care of the sick, take care of the weak, take care of the oppressed." 

Despite being supportive of homosexual people, Dawkins has made comments labeled by some as transphobic. In a 2015 tweet, he stated "Is trans woman a woman? Purely semantic. If you define by chromosomes, no. If by self-identification, yes. I call her 'she' out of courtesy". In a 2021 tweet, he stated "Some men choose to identify as women, and some women choose to identify as men. You will be vilified if you deny that they literally are what they identify as. Discuss". For the latter tweet, his "Humanist of the Year" title was revoked by the American Humanist Association. He endorsed and recommended The End of Gender: Debunking the Myths about Sex and Identity a book by Debra Soh which puts forth gender-critical views.

Abortion 
Dawkins has expressed pro-choice views. Dawkins made a heavily criticized tweet where he stated that it would be immoral not to abort a fetus who had Down syndrome. The Down's Syndrome Association issued a response by saying that "At the Down's syndrome Association, we do not believe Down's syndrome in itself should be a reason for termination, however, we realize that families must make their own choice."

Dawkins later apologized.

Animal rights 
Dawkins is a supporter of animal rights. He has stated that he believes many kinds of animals have consciousness. "Consciousness has to be there, hasn't it? It's an evolved, emergent quality of brains. It's very likely that most mammals have consciousness, and probably birds, too." Dawkins has also been a major supporter of the Great Ape Project, a coalition of scientists and others who believe that non-human great apes should have the rights to life, the protection of individual liberty, and the prohibition of torture. Dawkins wrote an essay in The Great Ape Project, a book published by supporters of the project in which they expressed their views, along with Jane Goodall, Jared Diamond, and others. A passage from Dawkins's contribution is as follows:

Child sexual abuse 

In 2010, the Associated Press released a letter sent by Cardinal Ratzinger in 1985 to laicize Father Stephen Kiesle, a priest in Oakland, California. Christopher Hitchens and Richard Dawkins in 2010 publicly called for Ratzinger (then Pope Benedict XVI) to stand trial for failure to report suspected sex crimes to the police. Dawkins put £10,000 towards a fund that helped publish Geoffrey Robertson's 2010 book The Case of the Pope: Vatican accountability for human rights abuse which argues that Ratzinger maintained a policy of swearing sex abuse victims to secrecy and moving abusers between parishes until 2002, and that the Vatican is not a sovereign state and the pope is not immune to prosecution.

Dawkins suffered what he describes as "thirty seconds" of a "mild feeling-up" by a school teacher when he was "about nine or ten years old". In the 2006 book The God Delusion, he discussed the Roman Catholic Church sexual abuse scandal in Ireland, and noted an anecdote from an American woman brought up Catholic that the fear of burning in hell was, in her recollection, greater than the psychological effects of molestation by a priest. Mehdi Hasan criticised his use of anecdotal evidence for the controversial claim in a 2012 Al Jazeera English interview.

In the 2013 book An Appetite for Wonder he penned a paragraph on his recollection of being molested by a teacher, telling friends who the same thing had happened to, and the teacher's suicide. He expressed that public responses to pedophilia in schools had changed between when he was a child and in 2013, due to public attention given to British child abuse scandals. He argued that the sexual abuse he had received was "mild" and that he would not judge his teacher by the "standards of today", for which he was heavily criticised.  Dawkins expressed publicly that views in his own autobiography were intended as a reflection of his feelings about his own experiences, and that his comments in his autobiography were not intended to minimise the suffering of other people, and apologised for them. The comments generated controversy, with Peter Watt, the director of child protection at the National Society for the Prevention of Cruelty to Children, responded by saying that "Mr. Dawkins seems to think that because a crime was committed a long time ago we should judge it in a different way. But we know that the victims of sexual abuse suffer the same effects whether it was 50 years ago or today."

Views on religion

Dawkins is a noted critic of religion, atheist, anti-theist, anti-religionist and a secular humanist. Dawkins believes that there is a conflict between science and religion and that science prevails in the debate. Dawkins also thinks that parents forcing their religion on children is a form of mental child abuse and that religion in general is a form of cultural virus.

Dawkins advocates for what he calls "militant atheism" and believes that atheists should not hide their identities so that they can be better integrated into politics and society. Dawkins has written several books criticizing religion, most notably The God Delusion (2006). Dawkins has written that some of his main points in The God Delusion were that atheists can be happy and moral and that they should not be apologetic about their religious identities.

Christianity 

Dawkins has repeatedly criticized Christianity, believing that it has been a negative force throughout history. While he has praised the life of Jesus, he has been critical of the supernatural portions of Christianity and the effect it has on the world. Dawkins has argued that Jesus was a theist because everybody in his time was, and that his ethics should be separated from his theology. "I think we owe Jesus the honour of separating his genuinely original and radical ethics from the supernatural nonsense which he inevitably espoused as a man of his time", while also creating a T-shirt that read "Atheists for Jesus". Dawkins has also said that he is a "secular Christian"—in his words, "in the same sense as secular Jews have a feeling for nostalgia and ceremonies."

However, Dawkins, along with his criticism of Christian fundamentalists, has also criticized moderate Christians for fueling extremists by showing exterior niceness.

Islam 

Dawkins has also been critical of extreme Islam, while also indicating he has no great issue with the adherents of moderate Islam.  Due to his views on Islamic extremism, Dawkins declared that "Islam is the greatest force for evil in the world today".  In response, some commentators have accused Dawkins of Islamophobia.

Dawkins has criticized unscientific concepts in Islamic beliefs, such as the idea that an embryo starts as a blob, semen comes from the spine and the sun sets in a marsh.  In July 2017, Berkeley radio station KPFA cancelled a scheduled book event with Dawkins, after listeners called to complain about such comments, citing a 2013 tweet in which he called Islam "the greatest force for evil in the world today". Dawkins called the cancellation "truly astonishing", stating he had "never used abusive speech against Islam", but had criticized the "oppressive cruelties of Islamism".  KPFA has since invited Dawkins to discuss his views on KPFA's airwaves.

Dawkins said that Islam is not the main problem behind the actions of ISIS: "Religion itself is not responsible for this... It's also this feeling of political involvement." Dawkins has also described Islam as more problematic than Christianity:

Dawkins has generated controversy on Twitter when he wrote, "All the world's Muslims have fewer Nobel Prizes than Trinity College, Cambridge. They did great things in the Middle Ages, though." After receiving criticism for that, he tweeted in response, "Something you can convert to is not a race. A statement of simple fact is not bigotry. And science by Muslims was great in the distant past. Interesting concept: a simple statement of undeniable FACT can be offensive. Other examples where facts should be hidden because offensive?" Earlier that year, he also wrote, "Of course you can have an opinion about Islam without having read Qur'an. You don't have to read Mein Kampf to have an opinion about Nazism." Among the critics of these comments were Channel 4 economics editor Faisal Islam, who said, "I thought scientists were meant to upbraid journalists for use of spurious data points to 'prove' existing prejudgements," and columnist Tom Chivers in The Daily Telegraph. Dawkins has responded at length to the most common criticisms he has received in a post titled "Calm reflections after a storm in a teacup".

Dawkins has criticised the term Islamophobia. In 2015, along with the National Secular Society, he expressed opposition to a proposal by then Labour Party  leader Ed Miliband to make Islamophobia an "aggravated crime." Dawkins stated that the proposed law was too vague, put religion above scrutiny and questioned if it hypothetically could be used to prosecute Charlie Hebdo or if he could be jailed for quoting violent passages from Islamic scripture on Twitter.

Dawkins also commented on the short film Fitna produced by Geert Wilders, a film that argues that Islam promotes violence among its followers. Fitna caused an international uproar. Dawkins wrote that while Geert has done things that "justify epithets such as 'disgusting', or 'racist,' as far as this film is concerned, I can see nothing in it to substantiate such extreme vilification...Geert Wilders, if it should turn out that you are a racist or a gratuitous stirrer and provocateur I withdraw my respect, but on the strength of Fitna alone I salute you as a man of courage, who has the balls to stand up to a monstrous enemy."

Political views

War on Terror and terrorism 
Dawkins was opposed to the Iraq War. "Well what I really objected to was the lying about the motives for going into Iraq…it was an act of political opportunism." However, Dawkins supported the Afghan War. "I felt that America needed to try and find those responsible [for 9/11], and it did really appear as though Al-Qaeda was being actively encouraged by the Taliban regime in Afghanistan."

Dawkins held Islamic doctrine responsible for the Charlie Hebdo shooting.  His comments resulted in criticisms from several publications, including Al Jazeera, The Guardian, and Salon, deriding him as Islamophobic.

Stem cell research 
In the stem cell controversy, Dawkins favors stem cell research, even if it involves human embryos. "The 'embryos' used for stem cell research are no bigger than a pinhead, and completely lacking in sentience of any kind. The illogical and hypocritical inconsistency between [George W.] Bush's stance on embryonic stem cell research on the one hand, and on slaughtered and maimed Iraqis and Lebanese on the other, is the subject of this article."

Government

UK government 

Dawkins was highly critical of the UK government under former Prime Minister David Cameron. In an issue of New Statesman, Dawkins heavily criticized Cameron for what he saw as Cameron promoting religion, and specifically Christianity, in the UK and particularly denounced government-supported faith schools.

On Scottish independence, Dawkins joined more than 200 celebrities, including Helena Bonham Carter, Judi Dench, Stephen Hawking, and Andrew Lloyd Webber, in signing an open letter stating, "We want to let you know how very much we value our bonds of citizenship with you, and to express our hope that you will vote to renew them. What unites us is much greater than what divides us. Let's stay together," urging the Scottish people to vote "no" on the 2014 referendum on the issue. After the Brexit referendum, he tweeted "But if I were Scottish today I'd want to leave the nasty little backwater that England is becoming".

Dawkins was opposed to the UK European Union membership referendum 2016 and criticised David Cameron for calling it.

United States government 

Dawkins was very critical of the United States government under George W. Bush, especially his Iraq War decisions. He criticized Bush by stating that "George W. Bush says that God told him to invade Iraq (a pity God didn't vouchsafe him a revelation that there were no weapons of mass destruction)." Dawkins has also said that he thinks American politicians should pay more attention to America's secular crowd. "I think that may be a lesson politicians need to learn, that they don't only need to suck up to the Catholic lobby and the Jewish lobby and Islam, that lobby. Maybe the nonbelievers lobby is a lot more powerful than they realize." Also, Dawkins thinks that U.S. politicians should not invoke religion in their policies. "Politicians shouldn't be promoting religion as part of their government legislation." Dawkins has also expressed his belief that Bush was not actually elected in the controversial 2000 U.S. presidential election through an editorial in The Guardian:

Dawkins was a harsh critic of President Donald Trump. After Trump won the 2016 presidential election, Dawkins described him as "an unqualified, narcissistic, misogynistic sick joke".

Israeli–Palestinian conflict 
Dawkins has stated that he is "on the fence" about the Israeli–Palestinian conflict, and has stated on Twitter that "It is reasonable to both deplore both the original foundation of the Jewish State of Israel & aspirations now to destroy it." Dawkins said that "can you explain why Palestinian Arabs should be the ones to pay for Hitler's crimes? You surely aren't going to stoop to some kind of biblical justification for picking on that land rather than, say, Bavaria or Madagascar? Dawkins also expressed anger over Israeli actions during the 2014 Israel–Gaza conflict. He tweeted, "[t]he extent of the destruction in Gaza is obscene. Poor people. Poor people who have lost their homes, their relatives, everything."

Scientific views

Global warming 
Dawkins accepts that global warming is a major problem facing the world currently. He supported an initiative in which 56 newspapers from 47 countries simultaneously published a joint editorial expressing their views on climate change in order to promote awareness of the problem. He wrote, "[w]hatever you think about global warming and whether humans are responsible, I think we have to salute this remarkable feat of international cooperation." Dawkins has also stated that he accepts that global warming is a threat to the human species. Dawkins has also commended Al Gore's documentary An Inconvenient Truth and in response to the question "Is global warming a threat to the human species?" has replied: "Yes. You could say that the human species is a threat to the human species. I recommend Al Gore's film on global warming. See it and weep. Not just for the human species. Weep for what we could have had in 2000, but for the vote-rigging in Jeb Bush's Florida."

References 

Works cited
 

Richard Dawkins
Dawkins, Richard
Articles containing video clips